Martin Kornmesser is a graphic designer working at the ESA/NASA Hubble European Space Agency Information Centre (HEIC) in Munich/Garching. He obtained his degree in graphics design in Munich in 1989. Kornmesser has actively pioneered the exploration of the  world of computer graphics. In 1990 he was the co-founder of the company ART-M, where he created illustrations, wall-paintings and all kinds of graphics design before joining ESA's Hubble outreach group in 1999.

External links
About Martin Kornmesser
The European Homepage for the NASA/ESA Hubble Space Telescope
European Space Agency
Space Telescope European Coordinating Facility

German graphic designers
Living people
Year of birth missing (living people)